Akhyan (also Romanized as Akhyān) is a village in Kenarporuzh Rural District, in the Central District of Salmas County, West Azerbaijan Province, Iran. At the 2006 census, its population was 365, in 65 families.

References 

Populated places in Salmas County